This is the Recorded Music NZ list of number-one albums in New Zealand during the 2000s decade. Hayley Westenra's international debut album Pure charted at number one for 20 weeks. Four of the number one albums of the year have been from New Zealand artists: Bic Runga, Brooke Fraser, Fat Freddy's Drop, and Billy T James. Norah Jones' debut album Come Away with Me charted at number one for 13 weeks and was the top selling album for 2002.

In New Zealand, Recorded Music NZ compiles the top 40 albums chart each Monday. Over-the-counter sales of both physical and digital formats make up the data. Certifications are awarded for the number of shipments to retailers. Gold certifications are awarded after 7,500 sales, and platinum certifications after 15,000.

The following albums were all number one in New Zealand in the 2000s.

Number ones

Key
 – Number-one album of the year
 – Album of New Zealand origin
 – Number-one album of the year, of New Zealand origin

Notes

References

Number-one albums
New Zealand Albums
2000s